Ludwig Siebert may refer to:

 Ludwig Siebert (1874–1942); German Nazi politician 
 Ludwig Siebert (bobsleigh) (born 1939), German bobsledder